Jeffrey Linton Osborne (born March 9, 1948) is an American singer-songwriter, musician, and lyricist. He is the former drummer and lead singer of the American R&B/soul group L.T.D., with whom he began his musical career in 1970.

Biography

Early life and family
Osborne was born in Providence, Rhode Island. Born the youngest of twelve children which consisted of five brothers and six sisters, Osborne's family was musically inclined. Some of Osborne's siblings went on to have music careers as well; his brother Billy Osborne was his band-mate in L.T.D. Osborne's father, Clarence "Legs" Osborne, was a popular trumpeter who played with Lionel Hampton, Count Basie, and Duke Ellington. Osborne's father died in 1961 when Osborne was thirteen.

L.T.D.
Osborne began his music career in 1970 becoming a member of the American soul band "Love Men Ltd.", who would later become known as L.T.D. The band recorded hit singles such as "(Every Time I Turn Around) Back in Love Again" (1977), "Concentrate on You," "Love Ballad" (1976), and "Holding On (When Love Is Gone)" (1978). At first, Osborne served as only a drummer, sharing lead vocal duties with his brother Billy Osborne but, by 1976, he became the group's primary lead vocalist. Osborne and his brother both left the band in late 1980 to start solo careers. Osborne sang lead vocals on L.T.D.'s three No. 1 songs on the U.S. R&B Chart and for the band's three gold and platinum albums.

Solo career
In 1982, Osborne sang the opening song "I Just Want to Be Your Friend" for the comedy film The Toy. Osborne later released his self-titled debut album in 1982, which featured two hit singles, "On the Wings of Love" and "I Really Don't Need No Light" (1982), peaking at No. 29 and No. 39 on the pop chart respectively. It was followed the next year by Stay with Me Tonight, his first solo gold album, which spawned four more hits, "Don't You Get So Mad" (No. 25), the title track (No. 30), "Plane Love" (No. 10 R&B, No. 6 dance), and "We're Going All the Way (No. 48). "Stay with Me Tonight" (May 1984, No. 18) and "On the Wings of Love" (August 1984, No. 11) reached the UK Singles Chart.

In 1985, Osborne wrote the lyrics to the Whitney Houston hit "All at Once" (music by Michael Masser). He appeared on USA for Africa's fundraising single, "We Are the World" in 1985. Osborne sang the unreleased single "Everything Good Takes Time" which was part of a video tribute to Julius Erving (Dr. J) in 1987. He would later appear on Celebrity Duets in 2006, performing "On the Wings of Love" with Alfonso Ribeiro. Osborne lent his vocals to the theme song of the soap opera, Loving, from 1992 to 1995 as well as the first season theme song for the Kirstie Alley comedy Veronica's Closet.

Osborne had two more gold albums, Don't Stop and Emotional, the latter of which had his highest charting solo pop hit, "You Should Be Mine", which peaked at No. 13 in 1986. The following year, Osborne had the highest-charting hit of his career duetting with Dionne Warwick on "Love Power", which reached No. 12 on the Billboard Hot 100 and also topped the Adult Contemporary singles chart. It was a turning point in his pop success, as his albums and singles began charting lower and lower. Osborne's 1988 single "She's on the Left" would be his final Hot 100 entry, as well as his only No. 1 R&B hit.

Later career
In the new millennium, he returned with a series of albums that, while far from the success he enjoyed in the 1980s, returned him to Adult R&B radio, scoring modest chart singles such as "Rest of Our Lives" (No. 75, 2003) and his cover of Barbara Mason's classic "Yes, I'm Ready" (No. 64, 2005). In 2008, Osborne sang the national anthem before Game 4 of the NBA Finals at Staples Center in Los Angeles, a feat which he repeated in 2009, before Game 1 of the 2009 NBA Finals, and also again in 2010 before Game 1 of the NBA Finals, all at Staples Center in Los Angeles. He also performed the national anthem prior to Game 3 of the 1988 World Series, a feat he repeated two years later at Game 3 of the 1990 World Series, both at the Oakland Alameda County Coliseum in Oakland, California. He also regularly sang the national anthem before Hartford Whalers games. On March 1, 2010, Osborne appeared on The Bachelor: On the Wings of Love season finale, "After the Final Rose", singing his hit "On the Wings of Love" while Bachelor Jake Pavelka took to the dance floor with his newly announced fiancé, Vienna Girardi.

Personal life
Osborne has been married to Sheri Osborne since 1983, and together they have three daughters: Tiffany Nicole, Dawn and Jeanine Osborne; and a son, Jeffrey Jr.

Discography

Studio albums

Charted singles

Filmography
 The Young Messiah – Messiah XXI (2006) (DVD)

In media

He sang with Vonda Shepard at the bar in the end of episode four ("Without A Net") of season four of the television show Ally McBeal
Pam sang the first bars of "On the Wings of Love" from the album Jeffrey Osborne with Dwight's recorder accompaniment during a bird's funeral on The Office third-season episode "Grief Counseling"
A snippet of "On the Wings of Love" is often played on the E! show The Soup as a reoccurring joke every time Joel McHale mentions the current Bachelor season; on March 5 he was nominated for one of the Soup Awards and lost to Heidi Montag; despite the loss, he sang a parody of the song
Guest starred on the Robert Townsend sitcom, The Parent 'Hood
Played in the 1988 TV movie, Ladykillers and was the showpiece song
Guest starred on season 1 episode 17 of the TV series Cosby; he sang "You Should Be Mine (The Woo Woo Song)"
Sang "Far Longer than Forever" with Regina Belle in the end credits of the 1994 animated film, The Swan Princess
Sang the theme song for the ABC Daytime Drama Loving, from February 1992 until November 1995
Sang "Never Met a Woman (Like You)" in Steven Eugene Grove (saxophonist)'s aka: "Euge Groove" (2012) musical CD album House of Groove
Guest starred on season 2 episode 134 and 135 of the TV series Santa Barbara; he sang "On the Wings of Love" and "Greatest Love Affair".

Awards and honors
In 2019 Osbourne was recognized with the Wheeler community Spirit Award, given to a member of the Providence, RI community who advocates for those who have fewer opportunities. Recipients are recognized for their efforts in four key areas:

 Passion for equity and social justice, both locally and globally
 Appreciation for and promotion of the benefits of education
 Commitment to creating opportunities in the community for those who otherwise might not have a voice or an advocate
 Resilience in the face of challenge and adversity. We ask each recipient to attend the annual Wheeler School Community Potluck Dinner, where the award is presented. The Family Potluck dinner is a school-wide event, sponsored by the Upper School’s diversity club Students Involved in Cultural Awareness (SICA), the Office of Unity & Diversity, and the Wheeler Parent’s Association.

Osborne received the 2014 New England Pell Award for Artistic Excellence from Providence (Rhode Island)'s Trinity Repertory Company in honor of his artistic achievements and philanthropic work in Rhode Island.

Grammy Awards 
The Grammy Awards are awarded annually by the National Academy of Recording Arts and Sciences. Osborne has received four Grammy nominations.

See also
L.T.D. discography

References

External links
 
 [ Allmusic.com biography]
 Soultracks.com profile of Jeffrey Osborne
 Jeffrey Osborne at Wenig-LaMonica Associates
 VH1 bio on Jeffrey Osborne

1948 births
Living people
Musicians from Providence, Rhode Island
20th-century African-American male singers
American male singers
American soul singers
American funk singers
Private Music artists
21st-century African-American people